Henry III, Duke of Mecklenburg ( 1337 – 24 April 1383) was Duke of Mecklenburg from 1379 until his death.

Life 
Henry was the first son of Duke Albert II of Mecklenburg and his wife Euphemia of Sweden, the sister of King Magnus IV of Sweden.

Henry III was first married in 1362 to Ingeborg of Denmark, daughter of King Valdemar IV of Denmark.  They had four children:
 Albrecht IV, co-regent of Mecklenburg from 1383 to 1388
 Euphemia, married from 1377 to John V of Werle-Güstrow
 Maria of Mecklenburg-Schwerin, mother of Eric of Pomerania, married to Duke Wartislaw VII of Pomerania
 Ingeborg, from 1398 the abbess of the Poor Clares abbey in Ribnitz.

After Ingeborg's death, Henry was married on 26 February 1377 to Matilda of Werle, the daughter of Lord Bernard II of Werle.  This marriage remained childless.

After an accident at a tournament in Wismar, Henry III died on 24 April 1383 at his castle in Schwerin and was buried in the Doberan Minster.  His brother Magnus I and his son Albert IV took up a brief joint rule of Mecklenburg, which lasted until 1384.

External links 
 Genealogical table of the House of Mecklenburg

Footnotes 

Dukes of Mecklenburg
1330s births
1383 deaths
14th-century German nobility